The NWA Hawaii Heavyweight Championship is a professional wrestling championship sanctioned by the National Wrestling Alliance and is defended in the US state of Hawaii. The title, which is still currently defended, began in 
1935. From February 1940 through 1942 the title was known as the Hawaii Junior Heavyweight Championship.

Currently, the title is defended in the NWA affiliated promotion, Island Xtreme Wrestling Federation. Previously it was in 50th State Big Time Wrestling and Polynesian Wrestling.

Title history

See also
National Wrestling Alliance

References

External links
Wrestling-Titles.com

50th State Big Time Wrestling championships
National Wrestling Alliance championships
National Wrestling Alliance state wrestling championships
Professional wrestling in Hawaii